Dalailama vadim is a species of moth in the family Endromidae. It was described by in 2006. It is found in China (Sichuan).

References

Natural History Museum Lepidoptera generic names catalog

Endromidae
Moths described in 2006